Prince Ying may refer to either of the following Qing dynasty princely peerages:

 Prince Ying (穎), created in 1636
 Prince Ying (英), created in 1644

See also
Prince of Ying (disambiguation)